The Tinian Channel is an eight kilometre-wide channel in the Northern Mariana Islands. It lies to the south of the island of Tinian(15°00'N., 145°38'E.) is northeast of Aguijan Island, separating it from the island of Aguijan. Together, the two islands form the Tinian Municipality.

References

Geography of the Northern Mariana Islands